Shizuo (written: , , ,  or ) is a masculine Japanese given name. Notable people with the name include:

, Japanese immunologist
, Japanese sumo wrestler
, Japanese writer
, Japanese printmaker
, Japanese aikidoka
, Japanese-born American mathematician
, Japanese footballer
, Japanese pole vaulter
, Japanese sumo wrestler
, Japanese footballer and referee
, Japanese shot putter
, Japanese sport wrestler
, Japanese general

Japanese masculine given names